Operation Unicorn may refer to:

 Opération Licorne, a French peacekeeping operation in Côte d'Ivoire
 Opération Licorne, a French nuclear test in French Polynesia; see Fangataufa
 Operation Unicorn (Scotland), a supporting plan for Operation London Bridge being enacted following the death of Elizabeth II in Scotland

See also
 Unicorn (disambiguation)